Ranoidea fuscula is a species of tree frog in the subfamily Pelodryadinae, endemic to Indonesia.  Scientists have observed it in the Derewo River Basin in Papua Province, at 1890 meters above sea level.

This frog lives in mountain streams. Ranoidea fusculais closely related to Ranoidea dorsivena.

Original description

References

fuscula
Amphibians described in 2007
Frogs of Asia